Lake Hassel is a lake in Swift County, in the U.S. state of Minnesota.

Hassel is a name derived from Norwegian, meaning "hazel".

See also
List of lakes in Minnesota

References

Lakes of Minnesota
Lakes of Swift County, Minnesota